The 1872 United States presidential election in West Virginia took place on November 5, 1872. All contemporary 37 states were part of the 1872 United States presidential election. The state voters chose five electors to the Electoral College, which selected the president and vice president.

West Virginia was won by the Republican nominees, incumbent President Ulysses S. Grant of Illinois and his running mate Senator Henry Wilson of Massachusetts. Grant and Wilson defeated the Liberal Republican and Democratic nominees, former Congressman Horace Greeley of New York and his running mate former Senator and Governor Benjamin Gratz Brown of Missouri by a margin of 4.46%.

Results

References

West Virginia
1872
1872 West Virginia elections